Sośnica  is a village in the administrative district of Gmina Kąty Wrocławskie, within Wrocław County, Lower Silesian Voivodeship, in south-western Poland. Prior to 1945 it was in Germany.

Field Marshal Gebhard Leberecht von Blücher is buried here. His remains were moved after the Cold War by a local priest from the original tomb in nearby Krobielowice (Krieblowitz), which was desecrated by Russian soldiers in 1945.

References

Villages in Wrocław County